Astylopsis macula is a species of longhorn beetles of the subfamily Lamiinae. It was described by Say in 1826.

References

Beetles described in 1826
Acanthocinini